Curve Music is an independent record label based in Toronto, Ontario.

Artists

Current artists 

 Suitcase Sam
 Scott B. Sympathy
 Pretty Archie
 The Weight Band
 Garth Hudson
 Driveway
 Jack Connely
 Holly McNarland
 Lindsay Broughton
 Tom Taylor
 Western Swing Authority

Former artists 

 The Dead South

References

External links 
 

Indie rock record labels
Canadian independent record labels
Record labels established in 2002
2002 establishments in Ontario